Etulia is a commune in the Gagauz Autonomous Territorial Unit of the Republic of Moldova. It is composed of three villages: Etulia, Etulia Nouă and Etulia station. The 2004 census listed the commune as having a population of 3,649 people.  3,382 inhabitants are Gagauz. Minorities included 31 Russians, 43 Ukrainians, 24 Bulgarians, 164 Moldovans and 1 Greek.

Its geographical coordinates are 45° 32' 21" North, 28° 26' 34" East.

Etulia Nouă 

Etulia Nouă (Eni Tülüküü), located near Lake Yalpuh, has the following ethnic structure, according to the 2004 Moldovan Census:

Etulia (stație c.f.) 
Etulia (stație c.f.) (Tülüküü, demir yolu), located near the railway station of Etulia has the following ethnic structure according to the 2004 Moldovan Census:

References

Etulia